The Outeniqua Pass is a mountain pass in the Western Cape, South Africa, that carries the N9/N12 national road through the Outeniqua Mountains north of George. It connects George and the Garden Route coastal plain with Oudtshoorn and the Little Karoo. It was constructed between 1943 and 1951, replacing the Montagu Pass as the main route from George to the interior.

References

 

Mountain passes of the Western Cape